Engelbert of Cleves, Count of Nevers (26 September 1462 – 21 November 1506) was the younger son of John I, Duke of Cleves and Elizabeth of Nevers, only surviving child of John II, Count of Nevers.

In 1481, he was sent with a large army to the Bishopric of Utrecht by his brother John II, Duke of Cleves where they successfully ousted David of Burgundy. But after the Siege of Utrecht (1483) he had to flee, and Utrecht returned to the control of Burgundy.
 
He married Charlotte of Bourbon-Vendôme, daughter of John VIII, Count of Vendôme, circa 1489. They had three children :
 Charles II, Count of Nevers, married Marie of Albret, Countess of Rethel. 
 Louis of Cleves (1494-1545), Count of Auxerre (1543-1545), married (1542) to Catherine d'Amboise, daughter of Charles I d'Amboise, widow of Christophe de Tournon and Philibert de Beaujeu;
 François of Cleves († 1545), Abbot of Tréport, Prior of Saint-Éloi in Paris

Engelbert became Count of Nevers and Eu in 1491 upon the death of his maternal grandfather John II, Count of Nevers. His eldest brother John II (1458–1521) inherited Cleves.

Ancestors

References
 
 Detlev Schwennicke: Europäische Stammtafeln. Band I, 1975, S. 190. (DNB 750531436)
 Jacques Dupont, Jacques Saillot: Cahiers de Saint Louis. Verlag Jacques Dupont, Angers 1976, S. 267.

1462 births
1506 deaths
Counts of Nevers
16th-century peers of France